Trnovitički Popovac   is a village in Croatia. It is connected by the D26 highway. Its time zone is UTC+1.

Populated places in Bjelovar-Bilogora County